John Pollono is an American playwright, screenwriter, and actor. He is best known for writing the 2017 film Stronger and the plays Small Engine Repair and Lost Girls, which premiered Off-Broadway in 2013 and 2015, respectively. As an actor, he is known for his recurring roles in the TNT series Mob City and NBC's This Is Us.

Pollono is active in the Los Angeles theater scene; he is one of the playwrights-in-residence at Rogue Machine Theatre and a part of The Temblors playwriting collective.

Early life and education 
Pollono was born May 23, 1972, in New Hampshire into a working-class Italian-American family; he has three sisters. He was raised in Londonderry, New Hampshire and graduated from Londonderry High School. Pollono has said that his childhood in New England has greatly influenced his work.

Pollono attended the University of New Hampshire, from which he graduated with a Bachelors of Arts in 1994. During one college summer, he studied film directing at New York University. After he moved to Los Angeles, he studied acting for a time at Howard Fine Studio.

Career

2000–2010: Early career 
Pollono moved around the country and worked on writing screenplays part-time, before settling in Los Angeles in 2000. He later became interested in acting and helped to found the Jabberwocky Theatre Company in 2004. In 2008, Jabberwocky became Rogue Machine Theatre. Through Jabberwocky and Rogue Machine, Pollono was able to produce the plays he had written, his first full-length play being Lost and Found which was originally produced in 2006 at the Lounge Theatre in Los Angeles.

His next produced play was Razorback, which was staged in 2008 at Rogue Machine. One of his one-act plays, Illuminati, won Best Play at the 2010 Network One-Act Festival in New York City and his first iteration of his play Rules of Seconds was chosen to participate in the 2011 Last Frontier Theatre Conference in Alaska.

During this time, Pollono also guest starred in television series including How I Met Your Mother and Grey's Anatomy, and had other small acting credits on film and stage. He also worked professionally in entertainment PR.

2011– 2017: Success on stage and screen

Stage 
In 2011, Rogue Theatre produced Pollono's black comedy play Small Engine Repair, which in large part was inspired by his upbringing outside of Manchester, New Hampshire. Pollono starred as Frank, one of the play's three main characters. The play was first staged at Theatre/Theater in Los Angeles and was very successful, later transferring to the Beverly Hills Playhouse. A year-and-a-half later, the play was produced by MCC Theatre in New York City and premiered at the off-Broadway Lucille Lortel Theatre. This marked Pollono's debut off-Broadway as a playwright and actor.

Simultaneously, Pollono's new play, Lost Girls premiered in Los Angeles at Theatre/Theater in Fall 2013. Lost Girls was picked up by MCC Theatre for their 2015–2016 season and as produced off-Broadway in Fall 2015. Like Small Engine Repair, Lost Girls played at the Lucille Lortel Theatre and was directed by Jo Bonney.

In 2017, Pollono joined with other Los Angeles-based playwrights to form the playwriting collective The Temblors. A reworking of his play Rules of Seconds was produced in 2017 at the Los Angeles Theatre Center.

Screenwriting and acting 
Pollono's first notable screen acting role was as Pat Dolan in the TNT series Mob City in 2013. Pollono's character appears in all six episodes of the show. Of note, Mob City stars Jon Bernthal, who Pollono had just acted opposite in Small Engine Repair at Theatre/Theater before production of the television show began. In 2014, Pollono guest starred in an episode of Intelligence. In 2016, Pollono began portraying Tyler, a co-worker of the character Randall in This Is Us.

In 2014, Pollono was tapped to write the screenplay for what would become the 2017 film Stronger, which starred Jake Gyllenhaal as Boston Marathon bombing survivor Jeff Bauman. The screenplay, based on Bauman's memoir Stronger, was number two on the Black List in 2016 and the film was released in 2017 to critical acclaim.

During the beginning of 2019, Pollono reprised his role in the film adaptation of Small Engine Repair, his directorial debut. The film was released in September 2021.

2018–present: Upcoming projects 
In February 2019, it was announced that Pollano was writing a screenplay based on the life of Hulk Hogan for Netflix. Directed by Todd Phillips and co-written by Scott Silver, the team that produced 2019's Joker, the film will star Chris Hemsworth.

Personal life 
Pollono is married to stage actress and founding member of Rogue Machine Theatre Jennifer Pollono; they have two children together, including actress Sophie Pollono.

Pollono lives in Los Angeles.

Works

Plays 
Selected works

Lost and Found, 2006, 2010 (rewrite)
Razorback, 2008
Illuminati, 2010
Rules of Seconds, 2011, 2017 (rewrite)
Small Engine Repair, 2011
Lost Girls, 2013

Screenplays 

Sex & Marriage, 2013 (short film)
Stronger, 2017
Small Engine Repair, 2021
Untitled Hulk Hogan Biopic, TBA (with Scott Silver and Todd Phillips)

Acting credits

Film

Television

Theater 
Selected credits

Publications 

 Pollono, John. Small Engine Repair. New York: Dramatists Play Service, 2014. .
 Pollono, John. Lost Girls. New York: Dramatists Play Service, 2016. .

References 

1971 births
Living people
American dramatists and playwrights